ALSC may refer to:

 Association for Library Service to Children
 Association of Literary Scholars and Critics
 Alert Life Sciences Computing, Inc.